Cyrill Gloor (born 23 May 1982) is a footballer from Switzerland who currently plays as defender for Old Boys Basel in the Swiss 1. Liga.

Gloor made four appearances in the Nationalliga A for FC Aarau.

See also
Football in Switzerland
List of football clubs in Switzerland

References

1982 births
Living people
Swiss men's footballers
FC Concordia Basel players
FC Aarau players
Association football defenders